Siméon-Guillaume de La Roque (born in 1551 near Clermont-en-Beauvaisis – died in 1611) was a French Baroque poet.

Like Philippe Desportes, he attended Maréchale de Retz's salon. He was in the service of Henri d'Angoulême, bastard son of Henri II, then in that of the de Guise family. Ligueur with his protectors, La Roque returned to the court after the abjuration of Henri IV (1594).

The poetry of Siméon-Guillaume de La Roque combines the influence of Ronsard and Desportes, not without drawing directly from various Italian sources. It influenced François de Malherbe, whose author was a friend. By choosing his themes and rhythms, his work is thus at the crossroads of all poetic destinies.

Selected works 
Les Premières Œuvres de S.-G. de La Roque (1590)
Amours de Caritée (1595)
Continuation de l'Angélique d'Arioste (1595)
Les Heureuses amours de Cloridan (1596)
Diverses poésies (1597) Read online
Hymne sur l'embarquement de la Royne et de son arrivée en France (1600)
Les Œuvres du sieur de La Roque (1609)
La Chaste bergère, pastorale (1629) Read online

References

External links 
 Biographie, œuvres de Siméon-Guillaume de La Roque
 Poems by Siméon-Guillaume de La Roque
 Siméon-Guillaume de La Roque's works
 Siméon-Guillaume de La Roque on Short Edition

16th-century French poets
French male poets
1551 births
1611 deaths
Baroque writers